Barry Morrison (born 8 May 1980) is a Scottish former professional boxer who competed from 2003 to 2012. He held the British super lightweight title in 2007.

Professional career
Morrison's first professional fight was in April 2003 at the York Hall, Bethnal Green, London, England, when he defeated the Welshman Keith Jones on points over four rounds.

References

External links
 

Scottish male boxers
1980 births
Living people
People educated at Taylor High School, New Stevenston
Light-welterweight boxers
Sportspeople from Bellshill